Roxy Hunter is a fictional character played by Aria Wallace in four television films for Nickelodeon in the United States: Roxy Hunter and the Mystery of the Moody Ghost (2007), Roxy Hunter and the Secret of the Shaman (2008), Roxy Hunter and the Myth of the Mermaid (2008), and Roxy Hunter and the Horrific Halloween (2008).

Roxy Hunter and the Mystery of the Moody Ghost
Roxy Hunter and the Mystery of the Moody Ghost is a 2007 Canadian Nickelodeon Original Movie, and is the first TV movie of the Roxy Hunter Movies. It is produced by Dolphin Entertainment, that premiered on October 30, 2007. It premiered on Family on May 19, 2008.

The animation sequences were produced by Nickelodeon Animation Studio.

Synopsis
In 1944, a woman who was planning to get engaged was stopped by her father's gun. 63 years later, Roxy Hunter, an irrepressible 9-year-old moves to a spooky, old house in the country. There, she stumbles into a weird world of unsolved mysteries and the unknown. With the help of her best friend Max, a 12-year-old genius she calls her fiancé, she embarks on a mission to solve a crime, save their house, and re-unite lost love from beyond the grave.

Cast
 Aria Wallace as Roxy Hunter
 Robin Brûlé as Susan Hunter
 Demetrius Joyette as Max
 Yannick Bisson as Jon
 Vik Sahay as Ramma
 Jessica Booker as Estelle
 Rod Campbell as Mr. Moody
 Austin MacDonald as Andy
 Johnie Chase as Johnie Chase
 Lara Jean Chorostecki as Young Estelle
 Jayne Eastwood as Mable Crabtree
 Stephanie Anne Mills as Rebecca
 Sebastian Pigott as Ted Caruthers
 R.D. Reid as Middleton
 Julian Richings as Librarian Tibers
 Sandi Ross as Nurse

Books
On December 13, 2007, Penguin Children's Books released the Roxy Hunter book line which includes junior novels Roxy Hunter and The Mystery of the Moody Ghost and The Secret of the Shaman by Tracey West. Accompanying the novels was The Roxy Hunter Case Files by James Kee and Robin Dunne. Each case file gives a journal-like first-person account of each mystery from the perspective of Roxy herself.

DVD release
The movie was released on DVD on February 5, 2008.

Roxy Hunter and the Secret of the Shaman
Roxy Hunter and the Secret of the Shaman is a 2008 Canadian Nickelodeon Original Movie that aired on February 1, 2008. It is a direct sequel to the Roxy Hunter and the Mystery of the Moody Ghost. The movie is produced by Dolphin Entertainment. This movie was dedicated to Jeanne Culp.

Synopsis
When it is near Serenity Falls's 150th anniversary, a part of the celebration lighthouse is stolen, which is being used by a shaman Roxy is learning about for a Festival of the Lights.

Cast

Main
 Aria Wallace as Roxy Hunter
 Robin Brûlé as Susan Hunter
 Demetrius Joyette as Max
 Yannick Bisson as Jon Steadman
 Vik Sahay as Ramma
 Richard McMillan as Shamam Karrie

Supporting
 Julian Richings as Mr. Tibers 
 Lorne Cardinal as Lorne Red Deer 
 Joe Pingue as Deputy Sheriff Martin Potts 
 Austin MacDonald as Andy 
 Tara Shelley as Jill 
 Connor Fyfe as Timmy 
 Tyler Fyfe as Tommy 
 Connor McCauley as Seth

DVD release
The movie was released on DVD on July 15, 2008.

Roxy Hunter and the Myth of the Mermaid

Roxy Hunter and the Myth of the Mermaid is a 2008 Canadian Nickelodeon Original Movie that aired on July 13, 2008, and is the third edition to the Roxy Hunter movies, plus a direct sequel to the previous movie Roxy Hunter and the Secret of the Shaman.

Synopsis
Roxy is at it again when, in pursuit of a local journalism award, she befriends and brings home a mysterious amnesiac who was found soaking wet outside of the local coffee shop. After ceremoniously naming her Annie Nonomys, Roxy takes the young lady home and finds that even the most common household item is a complete mystery to Annie. When Annie returns dripping wet from the lake several nights in a row, Roxy determines what is abundantly clear to her: Annie is a mermaid, who has to find her way home back in the sea.

Cast

Main
 Aria Wallace as Roxy Hunter
 Demetrius Joyette as Max 
 Robin Brûlé as  Susan Hunter 
 Yannick Bisson as Jon Steadman 
 Ashleigh Rains as  Annie

Supporting
 Denis Akiyama as Kyoto 
 Roger Dunn as Sheriff Tom
 Jeffrey R. Smith as Saul 
 Jayne Eastwood as Mable Crabtree 
 Tyler Fyfe as Tommy 
 Connor Fyfe as Tommy 
 Gerry Mendicino as Nikos
 Deborah Grover as Ms. Slausen 
 Kevin Jubinville as Kip 
 Austin MacDonald as Andy 
 Connor McAuley as Seth 
 Joe Pingue as Deputy Potts 
 Gord Rand as Louis 
 Julian Richings as Mr. Tibers 
 Vik Sahay as Rama 
 Cliff Saunders as Dessie

DVD releases
The movie was released on DVD on October 14, 2008.

Roxy Hunter and the Horrific Halloween
Roxy Hunter and the Horrific Halloween is a 2008 Canadian Nickelodeon Original Movie that aired on October 31, 2008, and it is the fourth and final addition to the Roxy Hunter movies, and is a direct sequel to the previous movie Roxy Hunter and the Myth of the Mermaid. The movie premiered on The N on October 31, 2008, as part of their Halloween Block, and did not premiere on Nickelodeon proper.

Plot
Roxy Hunter (Aria Wallace) walks out of school to find a new boy from Transylvania named Stefan (Connor Price) being bullied. Finally snapping, Stefan throws his lunch at Seth (Connor McAuley), the head bully. However, Seth ducks, and the food hits Roxy, and the two of them start a fierce rivalry. On her mother Susan's (Robin Brule) advice, she decides to try to make peace with Stefan.

Meanwhile, Max (Demetrius Joyette) is having his last day at Moody Mansion, before his parents come to pick him up. However, he learns that they can't come because of getting a huge cut of a gold mining expedition via video chat. Heartbroken, Max skips out on dinner and spends all of his time in his bedroom. Meanwhile, Susan is slightly shocked to find out that Jon (Yannick Bisson) wants to move in with her.

When Roxy goes to visit Stefan at his house, she sees an old woman (Maria Lebb) stirring something strangely red in a cauldron. When Roxy points out that the house is so quiet and dark, Stefan says his uncle Vlad Petrescu (Juan Chioran) sleeps during the day, and is very sensitive to light. When they go into Stefan's room, Vlad enters a short while after, telling them to keep the noise down. As he leaves, Roxy notices something red on his hand, as though dried blood.

At home, she quickly starts to believe that Stefan's family are vampires. She meets Stefan at a small gazebo in the woods with garlic and different holy relics to test whether or not he is a vampire. He passes the test, but it is clear that he has no idea that his uncle is a vampire. Roxy hastily says goodbye and runs off.

Finding Seth and his gang, Roxy tells them about this, and they go and investigate. Roxy and Seth find several wooden crates in Vlad's barn. In one of them is a horrifying painting. Vlad hears their screaming, and the club shoots him with garlic and holy water-loaded water guns, they realized that Vlad is not affected and they run off, but Vlad manages to catch Roxy. When he calls Susan over, Roxy blurts out "He's a vampire!". Vlad then explains that he is a painter and the "blood" on his hands is merely red paint. Roxy apologizes, but still gets grounded. However, she receives a letter from Stefan saying to meet him at the gazebo. Once there, Roxy learns that Stefan's parents are very poor, and his father (Martin Roach), an artist, hoped that Vlad, who is really a family friend, could sell his paintings (the ones that Roxy found in the crates the previous day) in America, but it turns out that Vlad has signed his name on the paintings to sell them for his own benefit.

Meanwhile, Max meets up with his old friend Jill (Tara Shelley) to egg the sheriff's house. However, the eggs were actually hard-boiled and break right through the window. While everyone else runs off, Max stays, knowing he deserves to be punished. The sheriff tells him about a high school prank gone wrong, resulting in the entire school burning down. His father tried to send him to a military academy, but he ran away to go on an amateur music tour. When he got back, he wanted to tell his father that he had learned that he was acting in his son's best interest, but his father had died. He ends the story by letting Max off the hook after telling him that, though his parents have let him down, it does not mean that they do not love him.

Susan gives Roxy a spark of idea on how to stop Vlad and make him confess: scaring the confession out of him. They set up a haunted house, with various scares along the way, until it ends in Vlad running into the forest. Roxy says that she is a vampire, and that she will turn him into a living dead. Terrified, he confesses to his crimes, and the sheriff, who was spying on Roxy's plan takes him to jail for.

At dinner, Jon proposes to Susan. She accepts and they are engaged. Max learns to overcome his depression. Best of all, with the money for the paintings, Stefan's parents are able to come to America.

Cast

Main
 Aria Wallace as Roxy Hunter
 Demetrius Joyette as Max
 Robin Brûlé as Susan Hunter
 Yannick Bisson as Jon
 Connor Price as Stefan

Supporting
 Devon Bostick as Drew
 Juan Chioran as Vlad Petrescu
 Brandon Craggs as Stevie
 Roger Dunn as Sheriff Tom
 Jacob Fraud as Timmy
 Tyler Fyfe as Tommy
 Marcia Laskowski as Janet
 Maria Lebb as Grandma Petrscu
 Austin MacDonald as Andy
 Connor McAuley as Seth
 Joe Pingue as Deputy Potts
 Julian Richings as Mr. Tibers
 Martin Roach as Pierre
 Victor Gares as Rama
 Tara Shelley as Jill

References

External links 
 
 
 
 

Female characters in film
Film characters introduced in 2007
Child characters in film
Fictional American people
2007 films
2008 films

nl:Roxy Hunter